is a dormant volcano located in the Hidaka Mountains, Hokkaidō, Japan. it has not erupted in the last 10,000 years.  and were active about 1.1-0.1 million years ago  It is at an elevation of  from sea level.

References

 Google Maps
 Geographical Survey Institute
 Shyun Umezawa, Yasuhiko Sugawara, and Jun Nakagawa, Hokkaidō Natsuyama Gaido 4: Hidaka Sanmyaku no Yamayama (北海道夏山ガイド4日高山脈の山やま), Sapporo, Hokkaidō Shimbunshya, 1991. 

Tomuraushi (Hidaka)